Margaretta Riley, née Hopper (May 4, 1804 - July 16, 1899) was an English botanist. She studied ferns and was the first British pteridologist of her sex.

Life
She was born in Castle Gate, Nottingham on 4 May 1804 to Richard and Margaretta Hopper. She married John Riley in 1826, agent for the Montague family in Papplewick, north of Nottingham, where she lived for the rest of her life.

Margaretta Riley and her husband worked together as pteridologists studying ferns. They were both members of the Botanical Society of London − he from 1838, and she from 1839 on.

She discontinued her botanical research when she was widowed in 1846.

Legacy
The Riley (crater) on the planet Venus was named after her.

Works
Publications by Margaretta Riley include:
 On the British Genus Cystea (1839)
 On growing ferns from seed, with suggestions upon their cultivations and preparing the speciments (1839)
 Polypodium, Dryopteris and calcareum (1841)

References

 Mary R. S. Creese: Ladies in the Laboratory? American and British Women in Science, 1800-1900: A Survey of their Contributions to Research, London 1998

English botanists
British pteridologists
1804 births
1899 deaths
Women botanists
19th-century British botanists
19th-century British women scientists
Scientists from Nottingham